Scare Tactics is an American comedy horror hidden camera television show, produced by Scott Hallock and Kevin Healey. Its first two seasons aired from April 2003 to December 2004. After a hiatus, the show returned for a third season, beginning July 9, 2008. The first season of the show was hosted by Shannen Doherty. Stephen Baldwin took her place in the middle of the second season. At the beginning of the third season, the show was hosted by Tracy Morgan. The fourth season began on October 6, 2009. On July 17, 2017, it was announced that Blumhouse Television was going to produce a new season of the show.

In Europe, the first season of the program aired on MTV Central from 2003 to 2004. The show was also broadcast in Australia on Fox8, in Canada on MTV, in India on AXN, in Russia on MTV Russia (only the first two seasons), in Turkey on Dream TV, in Poland on TV Puls, in Finland on Jim, in South Korea on Q TV, in Sweden initially on TV6, and then on TV11. The program was distributed internationally by Rive Gauche Television.

Format 
Scare Tactics is a hidden camera prank show that puts victims into terrifying situations, usually involving movie-style special effects and makeup that recreates horror movie clichés. The victims, generally four per episode, are set up by friends/family in tandem with producers.

Unlike other hidden camera shows, Scare Tactics was shot and edited in a  cinematic style intended to give each piece the look and feel of a scary movie.

There are some instances where the victims are lured into the pranks on the promise of being on a fake reality show called "Fear Antics" which plays off like a show similar to MTV's Jackass but end with dire consequences. Sometimes, the victim will attempt keeping calm and rationally try keeping the situation from getting out of control (from their perspective).

The pranks end when the victim is completely terrified and someone would ask them, "Are you scared?" to which they usually reply in the affirmative. They then get the reply, "You should be! You're on Scare Tactics!" or "I'll have to/I'm gonna put you on Scare Tactics!". Alternately, at times when a victim almost ran for their lives, they immediately announced the same thing. Once or twice, a victim realized they were on Scare Tactics. Rarely, a victim will assault an actor playing a psycho in a moment of courage; forcing the crew to end charade.

Guest stars
 Matt Hardy (Season 3, Episode 15)
 Judah Friedlander
 Brooke Hogan (Season 5, Episode 1)
 Lauren Ash
 Eric Stonestreet (Season 3, Episode 17)
 Marc Evan Jackson
 Dot-Marie Jones

List of Scare Tactics episodes

Season One
 101: UFO Abduction, Firing Range, Buried Alive, Camp Killer
 102: Bigfoot Attacks, Where's Shannen?, Flatline, Psycho Hitchhiker
 103: Organ Harvest, Monster in the Closet, Disappearing Stripper, Limo in Area 51
 104: Clone Attack, Orgy from Hell, Repo Man, Monkey Trouble
 105: Meteor Man, Date with the Devil, Barbershop of Blood, Taxi Cab Carnage
 106: Lab Spill, Haunted Babysitter, Serial Killer, Hellride
 107: Tanning Salon Terror, Cable Killers, Little Girl Psychic, Runaway Corpse
 108: Ghost Train, Body in Trunk, Dominatrix for a Day, Desert Monster
 109: UFO Trailer Attack, The Cannibal Family, Séance from Hell, Driving the Dead
 110: Harsh Reality, Dr. Werewolf, Boy in a Bubble, Virgin Sacrifice
 111: Chupacabra Attack, Deadly Secret, Lights Out, Black Magic
 112: Hazmat Hell, Surgery Nightmare, Death Lunch, Bad Seed
 113: Laboratory Meltdown, Eye Witness, Unborn Clones, Silo Scare
 114: Deadly Feast, Fear in the Box, Fear Antics: Psycho, Maniac Cop
 115: Killer Clown, Lethal Conversation, Caught on Camera, Demonic Duel
 116: Chainsaw Attack, Beastly Breakout, Deadly Hicks, Alien Returns
 117: Dangerous Obsession, Web of Evil, Laboratory of Blood, Repo from Hell
 118: Security Breach, Taste for Blood, Zombie Grandma, Killer Car
 119: Bad Medicine, Killer Queen, Dead Alive, Alien Hunters
 120: Massacre Under the House, Unholy Ground, Video Victim, Mask of Death
 121: Lethal Touch, Showgirl's Revenge, Terror Next Door, Bigfoot Returns
 122: Home Invasion, Demonic Possession, Fatal Beauty, The Hunted
 123 Special: The Bloody Mirror, Camp Killer, Deadly Infestation, Harsh Reality, Voodoo Resurrection, Psycho Hitchhiker

Season Two
 201: Rage from the Cage, Killer Bees, Bring Out the Gimp, Grave Robbers
 202: Street Justice, That's Not Santa, Freaks Come Out at Night, Possessed Office
 203: Gorilla with a Fist, Regression Aggression, Fear Antics: Mandroid's Revenge, Flowers for My Lady
 204: What's in the Box?, Stakeout, Shocker, Radio Daze
 205: Brother's Keeper, Cult Compound Crackdown, Revenge of the Switchhiker, Drug Ring Sting
 206: Toilet Full of Scary, Desert Cult Trailer Attack, Wrath of the Mummy, Juvenile Justice
 207: Slaughterhouse of Horror, Porn Dorm Massacre, Desert Ritual, Walk-in Portal
 208: Wired for Revenge, Shave and a Headcut, Summon the Demon, Fear Antics: Hotel Hell
 209: Motor Psychos, Attack of the Rat Monster, I Me Minefield, There Are Men Coming Here to Kill Me
 210: Piranhas in the Pond, Chambermaid of Horror, Shotgun Wedding, Critters
 211: If I Only Had Your Brain, Open the Pod Bay Door, Wired, Fear Antics: Room With a View
 212: Power Outrage, License to Drive, Wolfman Tells Campfire Stories, The Bagman
 213: Backwoods Booby Trap, Demon's List, Newest Mental Patient, Mob Morgue
 214: For Whom the Bridge Trolls, Party Forever (Parts 1 & 2), Burned Alive
 215: Drone Helicopter, Fed-Execution, Girl in a Blood-Soaked Dress, Dr. Jekyll & Mr. Hyde
 216: Unsafe, Eye of the Beholder, Tastes Like Chicken, Meet My Psycho Girlfriend
 217: Bedridden but Deadly, The Set Up (Parts 1 & 2), Lost and Found
 218: Pond Creature, Carface, Moonshine Mountain, Rubbed the Wrong Way
 219: Car Wash, Fear Antics: Running Man, Gimme a Hand, Spa of Death
 220: The Blob, Road Rage, Strip Club, Man of the Haunted House
 221: Alien House Call, Hackman Attacks, Final Entry, Hannah's Abduction

Season Three
 301: Satan's Baby, Wood Chipper, Psychic, Black Project
 302: 3:10 to Hell, Patient's Rage, Fire Starter, Affection
 303: Genie in a Beer Bottle, Vampire Spa, Escaped Mental Patient, Alien Eggs
 304: Psycho in a Box, Cheaters of Death, Welcome to the Neighborhood, Ice Man
 305: When White Noise Attacks, Phantom Power, Walled Off, Paralyzed With Fear
 306: The Screaming Room, Death Bed and Breakfast, Little Person, Big Kill, Welcome to the Dollhouse
 307: Frankenstein's Basement of Terror, Who's Your Dead Daddy?, Wired for Fear, Pool of Blood
 308: Taxi Cab Carnage, Alien Consortium, Double Trouble Clone, Junkyard Showdown
 309: Home Video Horror, Last Will and Testament, Voodoo Vixen, Assassin's Apprentice
 310: When the Larvae Breaks, To Catch a Predator, Curse of the Samurai, Pickled to Death
 311: Big Scoop of Scary, Home Invasion, Healer/Killer, Coffin Refill
 312: Blood Bath, Meteor Virus, Carmageddon, Welcome to the Dollhouse 2
 313: Satan's Baby Returns, Screaming Room 2, Barbershop of Blood 2, Junkyard Showdown 2
 314: Basket Case, Human Stew, Web of Lies, Breakdown
 315: Ghoul Bus, Criminal's Rage, Killer's Hideout, Psycho Kid
 316: Channeling the Dead, Black Project 2, Zombie Testing, A Quick Bite
 317: 28 Minutes Later, Nightmare Session, Zig the Clown, Paranormal Radio Show
 318: Ranger Danger, Mistaken Identity (Parts 1 & 2), The Doctor's Trip
 319: The Collector, Cleansing the House, Finding the Truth, Psycho Dance
 320: Toxic Shock, The Pimp, Female Serial Killer, Can I Have a Kiss?
 321: Tow Truck Killers, Radioactive Tanning, Mental Patient's Drug Overdose, Cannibal Party
 322: Ghoul Bus 2, Wrong Identity, Nightmare Motel, Criminal's Second Rage
 323: Dying to Kill!, Big Phantom Power, Re-hatched Alien Eggs, Old Man of Death

Season Four
 401: It's My Party, The Squatters, Fear Antics: Check Yourself, Crop Circle Showdown
 402: No Pain No Brain, Communicating With the Ghosts, The Freak Show, Blood on the Cosmos
 403: Killing Rosemary's Baby, Human Auction, Look in the Sky, Show and Hell
 404: Vampire Stakeout, Mind Killer, Wine to Die For, Grandpa Has Returned
 405: Life's a Witch, Revenge of the Werewolf, Alien Babysitter, Organ Harvesting Facility
 406: Alien Road Block, Lend Me a Hand, Black OPTS, Murderer Still at Large
 407: Valet Violence, Cursed Book, Possessed Farm, Demon Doll
 408: Tracy the Tour Guide, Into the Mist, Horror on the Horror Set, Death from Above
 409: Uh Oh! It's Maggots, Ultimate Alien Fighter, Fountain of Youth, He Shoots He Spores
 410: If These Walls Could Bleed, Size Splatters, Zombie Town, Truthisodes
 411: Chill Out, Reptile Creature Revolt, Gang Green Thumb, Scary Development
 412: Hot Under the Collar, Insanity Virus, No Asylum, Voo Doo You Love?
 413: Buzz Kill, Electrocutie, Ouija Sitter, Snakes in a Drain

Season Five 
 501: Driver's Dead, 2 Guys 1 Suit, The Brand, Human Doll Party
 502: Pregnant With A Mutant, Work Your Skin Off, Elite Body Guard Firm, Alien in a Box
 503: Blown to Green Pieces, Farm Troll, Welcome to the Psych Ward, Monsterious Waste
 504: Bicentennialien, Waste of Talent, Human Blood Drive, All Puzzled
 505: Barnacle Boy, Reviving Your Fate, Deadly Sibling Rivalry, Lost Your Hand
 506: Touched By an E.T., Human Clothing, Vampire Child, Nightmare Therapy
 507: The Happening Again, Don't Mess With the Boss, Fried Girl, The Missing Link
 508: Party 'Til You Nuke, The Enigma, Fear Antics: Hospital, Polterheist
 509: The Corpse Whisperer, Date From Hell, Carnivorous Flies, Send In The Clowns
 510: Alien Car Crash, Morgue Woman, El Scareiachi, Coma Killer
 511: Gnome Sweet Gnome, Fear Antics: Mailbox Killer, Baby Trauma, Secret Of Survival
 512: Fright at The End of the Tunnel, Look Who's Laughing, Wonderful Knife, Conjoin Me For Dinner
 513: Twilight My Fire, Crystal Myth, Double Cross Dress, Killer Performance

Country

Canada
 MTV
 MuchMusic
 Space

See also
 Infarto: A similar scare/prank show airing on TV Azteca and Azteca América.
 Room 401: A similar scare/prank show airing on MTV.

References

External links
 

2003 American television series debuts
2005 American television series endings
2008 American television series debuts
2013 American television series endings
2000s American reality television series
2010s American reality television series
2000s American horror comedy television series
2010s American horror comedy television series
American hidden camera television series
Syfy original programming
Practical jokes